Eshin Nishimura (西村 惠信; born 1933) is a Japanese Rinzai Zen Buddhist priest, the former president of Hanazono University in Kyoto, Japan, and also a major modern scholar in the Kyoto School of thought. A current professor of the Department of Buddhism at Hanazono University, he has lectured at universities throughout the world on the subject of Zen Buddhism. The author of many books, most written in the Japanese language, Nishimura has been a participant in many dialogues on the relationship of Zen to Christianity and Western philosophy.

Biography
Eshin Nishimura was born the youngest child of six siblings to a family of Rinzai practitioners. According to his own account, "Blessed with a profound karmic relationship with the Buddha, I entered the priesthood at age two and left my parents to live in a Zen temple as a priestling." Nishimura graduated from Hanazono University from their Department of Buddhist Studies in 1956. In 1969 he came to Oberlin College to give talks on Zen, and in 1970 and 1971 he taught a course for ten weeks on Zen at Carleton College and another course at Carleton on Keiji Nishitani's Religion and Nothingness in 1989.

Bibliography

Notes

References

Rinzai Buddhists
Zen Buddhist priests
Japanese Zen Buddhists
Living people
Year of birth missing (living people)
Japanese scholars of Buddhism